Edmund Morgan may refer to:

 Edmund Morgan (historian) (1916–2013), American historian of early American history
 Edmund Morgan (of Llandaff), Welsh politician who sat in the House of Commons in 1601 and 1621
 Edmund Morgan (bishop) (1888–1979), bishop of Southampton, and of Truro